Warrant officer of the Navy is the most senior Warrant Officer in the Royal New Zealand Navy. It is a singular appointment – it is only held by one person at any time.

The Warrant Officer of the Navy is responsible to the Chief of the Navy and is a member of their staff and provides the Chief of the Navy and senior leaders with advice about all issues affecting sailors.

Warrant Officers of the Navy

References

Royal New Zealand Navy
Warrant officers